Acinopus is a genus of beetles in the family Carabidae, containing the following species:

 Acinopus almeriensis Mateu, 1954
 Acinopus ambiguus Dejean, 1829
 Acinopus ammophilus Dejean, 1829 
 Acinopus antoinei Puel, 1934
 Acinopus arabicus Wrase & Kataev, 2016
 Acinopus baudii A. Fiori, 1913
 Acinopus boiteli Alluaud, 1930
 Acinopus brevicollis Baudi Di Selva, 1882
 Acinopus brittoni Wrase & Kataev, 2016
 Acinopus creticus Maran, 1947
 Acinopus dianae Schatzmayr, 1943
 Acinopus doderoi Gudelli, 1925
 Acinopus giganteus Dejean, 1831
 Acinopus grassator Coquerel, 1859
 Acinopus gutturosus Buquet, 1840
 Acinopus haroldii Schaum, 1863 
 Acinopus jeannei J. Vives & E. Vives, 1989
 Acinopus khalisensis Ali, 1967
 Acinopus labiatus (Erichson, 1843)
 Acinopus laevigatus Menetries, 1832
 Acinopus laevipennis Fairmaire, 1859
 Acinopus lepeletieri Lucas, 1846
 Acinopus liouvillei Puel, 1934
 Acinopus megacephalus P. Rossi, 1794
 Acinopus orszuliki Wrase & Kataev, 2016
 Acinopus picipes (Olivier, 1795) 
 Acinopus pilipes Piochard De La Brulerie, 1868 
 Acinopus pueli Schatzmayr, 1935
 Acinopus sabulosus Fabricius, 1792
 Acinopus sinaiticus Wrase & Kataev, 2016
 Acinopus striolatus Zoubkoff, 1833
 Acinopus subquadratus Brulle, 1832

References

Harpalinae
Carabidae genera
Taxa named by Pierre François Marie Auguste Dejean